Piszczaty-Kończany  is a village in the administrative district of Gmina Kobylin-Borzymy, within Wysokie Mazowieckie County, Podlaskie Voivodeship, in north-eastern Poland.

The village has a population of 106.

References

Villages in Wysokie Mazowieckie County
Łomża Governorate
Białystok Voivodeship (1919–1939)
Belastok Region